The Rat or Mouse (鼠) is the first of the repeating 12-year cycle of animals which appear in the Chinese zodiac, constituting part of the Chinese calendar system (with similar systems in use elsewhere). The rat is associated with the first branch of the Earthly Branch symbol 子 (zǐ), which starts a repeating cycle of twelve years. The Chinese word shǔ (鼠) refers to various small rodents (Muroidea), such as rats and mice. The term "zodiac" ultimately derives from an Ancient Greek term referring to a "circle of little animals". There are also a yearly month of the rat and a daily hour of the rat (Chinese double hour, midnight, 11:00 p.m. to 1:00 a.m.). Years of the rat are cyclically differentiated by correlation to the Heavenly Stems cycle, resulting in a repeating cycle of five years of the rat (over a sixty-year period), each rat year also being associated with one of the Chinese wu xing, also known as the "five elements", or "phases": the "Five Phases" being Fire ( huǒ), Water ( shuǐ), Wood ( mù), Metal ( jīn), and Earth ( tǔ).

First Year of the Rat

In Chinese tradition, the first year was the equivalent of 2637 BCE (although others give other dates). The Prime Minister of the first emperor, Huangdi (also known as the Yellow Emperor), is said in this year to have worked out the sixty-year zodiacal cycle. Part of this achievement was the discovery and incorporation of the nineteen-year so-called Metonic cycle which correlates lunar and solar dates, as part of the system (using leap months).

Years and the Five Elements

People born within these date ranges can be said to have been born in the "Year of the Rat", while bearing the following elemental sign: The following is a chart of the dates of the Gregorian calendar.

Lunar Mansion

In traditional Chinese astrology as well as traditional Chinese astronomy the sky was mapped into various asterisms or what are sometimes referred to as Chinese constellations. This is actually more similar to the zodiac of Western astrology than is the 12-animal cycle. The stars along the plane of the ecliptic were divided into groups known as the Twenty-Eight Mansions. Because the moon during its monthly cycle could be observed to appear to move from one mansion (or "camp") into the next each night in turn, they are also known as Lunar Mansions. Traditionally, these mansions were divided into four groups of seven each, and associated with one of four spiritual entities. The rat is generally associated with the celestial region of the Mystical Warrior, or Xuánwǔ ((玄武)), and specifically with the mansion Xū (虛), which in turn is associated with the direction North and the darkest part of the winter season, in the northern hemisphere. (Xū (虛) is more-or-less equivalent to Beta Aquarii, also known as Sadalsuud).

Hour of the Rat

In old Chinese tradition, the hours of a day-night period were divided into 12 double-hours, each corresponding to one of the twelve signs of the Chinese zodiac, with similar symbolic motif and astrological significance. The first of the twelve double hours encompasses midnight, at the middle of the double hour, corresponding with 11:00 p.m. to 1:00 a.m., with midnight being the midpoint of the first double-hour, which is the Hour of the Rat, or the hour zǐ.

Popular culture

In popular culture, the zodiacal idea of year of the rat is associated with various beliefs about prognostications for the upcoming year, lucky numbers, lucky colors, auspicious romantic connections, similarities between persons born in those years, correlations between Chinese astrology and Western astrology and the like. Traditional Chinese astrology and horoscope has paid much more attention to the Heavenly Stems and Earthly Branches than to the zoology or symbolism of the 12 animals; rather the reference to the animals was more of a way of horology, keeping track of time. Nevertheless, modern times have shown an increased interest in the zodiacal animals, with a great deal of popular interest, in various places of the world. In any case, the rat has long been associated with keen and quick intelligence.

Basic astrology elements

The Jade Emperor and the race for zodiacal place

A popular modern story has it that the order of the animals in the twelve-year cycle was due to a competition between animal candidates, held by the ruler of Heaven, Earth, and Hell — the Jade Emperor. According to one version of this tale, the emperor's advisors selected twelve candidates from among the animal types, including the rat and the cat. The winner was to be selected based upon merit, as to personal appearance, lifestyle, and contributions to the world. Before the competition, the cat asked the rat for a wake up call in order to get to the show on time; however, the rat apprehensive of the competition, especially as to the cat's apparent beauty, did not wake the cat, who then overslept (and, ever afterwards, the embittered cat became a ratter and a mouser). The Jade Emperor mystified as to why there were only eleven candidate animals to show up inquired of his servants. These servants hastily acquired the first possible replacement animal which they encountered, (a pig). After the start of the competition, the rat achieved first place by performing on the flute while upon the back of the ox. Impressed, the Jade Emperor placed the rat at the beginning of the twelve-year cycle (and the ox second, for being so generous as to allow the rat to play the flute upon the ox's back). Then the other animals were placed in order according to the Jade Emperor's judgment.

Famous and infamous people
In popular culture, much attention is directed towards supposed similarities of personalities of persons born in the year of the rat. For example, Al Gore, Richard Simmons, William Shakespeare, T. S. Eliot, and George Washington, and more, are all presented as examples of some sort of theme based upon being born in the year of the rat.

The zodiacal rat around the world

The zodiacal rat is known in other cultures besides China, in Asia and beyond. Generally, the rat/mouse is the first of a twelve-year animal cycle, although some of the other animals tend to vary. In Japan, the rat is known as nezumi, and is the first in a twelve-year zodiacal cycle of animals. The Year of the Rat and the years of the subsequent other zodiacal animals is celebrated during Chinese New Year, in many parts of the world, with the animal appropriate to each new year serving as an artistic motif for decorations. The Rat and other zodiacal animals are also a popular motif on Chinese lunar coins and other coin series minted by various countries and also on various internationally issued postage stamps.

In English, Rat Years are sometimes referred to as Mouse Years instead, although in Chinese there is no distinction between the terms.

See also
Burmese zodiac
Chinese astrology
Chinese calendar

References

Further reading and references consulted
Alston, Isabella and Kathryn Dixon (2014). Chinese Zodiac. (China: TAJ Books International) 
Hale, Gill (2002). The Practical Encyclopedia of Feng Shui. New York: Barnes and Noble Books. 

Wu, Zhonxian and Karin Wu (2014, 2016). Heavenly Stems and Earthly Branches:TianGan DiZhi. London and Philadelphia: Singing Dragon.

External links

Chinese astrological signs
Vietnamese astrological signs
Rats
Mythological rodents